Union Stage is an indoor music venue, club, and bar in Washington, D.C.. It is located in the The Wharf neighborhood of Southwest Waterfront.

Background

It is located in the The Wharf neighborhood of Southwest Waterfront, the venue is surrounded by several hotels, residential buildings, restaurants, shops, piers, as well as other music venues (including The Anthem and Pearl Street Warehouse). 

The first concert at Union Stage took place on Dec 29, 2017 and included The Duskwhales, Milo in the Doldrums, and Kid Brother. The venue features  square foot of floor space with a tap room and bar.

References

Music venues in Washington, D.C.
Event venues established in 2017
2017 establishments in Washington, D.C.